Thomas Ratliff (31 March 1836 – unknown) was an English first-class cricketer active 1869–80 who played for Middlesex. He was born in Camberwell.

References

1836 births
English cricketers
Middlesex cricketers
Year of death missing
Gentlemen of the North cricketers